Sons of Nanay Sabel is a 2019 musical comedy film written and directed by Dado Lumibao, starring Ai-Ai delas Alas, Mark Maglasang, Nova Villa and Flow G. The film was produced by Viva Films and it was released in the Philippines on May 8, 2019.

According to The Manila Times, the film was not "commercially successful".

Cast

Main cast

Supporting cast

Plot
Ai-Ai delas Alas as Nanay Sabel plays mother to her Ex Battalion kids including Flow G, Jon Gutierrez, John Maren Mangabang and Mark Maglasang. She was accused of being a negligent mother and later on she embarks on a journey to find her sons and reunite her whole family.

References

External links

Philippine comedy films
Viva Films films